Deadhead Miles is a 1972 American road comedy film directed by Vernon Zimmerman from a script by Terrence Malick, and starring Alan Arkin, Bruce Bennett and Paul Benedict. Actors George Raft and Ida Lupino make cameos.

Plot
Cooper (Alan Arkin) and Durazno knock out a truck driver and steal his rig. They take it back to a shop where it is repainted and the numbers are filed. In it they find a truckload of carburetors. Cooper abandons Durazno at a gas station and sets out as an independent driver of the yellow Peterbilt.

He picks up a hitchhiker (Paul Benedict) but refuses to also give a ride to the man's accompanying woman and dog. At a diner the two notice the Duke of Interstate 40 (Hector Elizondo) eating at another table. Cooper asks him about his rig, which annoys the Duke. Cooper and the hitchhiker watch Samson and Delilah at a drive-in as Cooper discusses professions he's considered as a means to make money and how he reads the almanac so that he can be learning and earning money at the same time.

Cooper visits a shopkeeper and attempts to earn money by either selling some of the stolen carburetors or hustling work as an independent hauler but is turned down because the shopkeeper works with the wholesalers. The hitchhiker finds several prospective customers in the meantime and they pack the already-full truck with tiles and live chickens to be hauled, stealing food and supplies from other trucks. They visit the place where Cooper says his wife lives but she is not there. They are pulled over by a policeman and Cooper lies that he recently returned from the war to get the officer to let him go quickly without checking the contents of the truck. During the night Cooper takes Benzedrine to stay awake while driving.

The next day they are once again stopped by the police and forced to show the logbook, which is not up to date. The police also note that the plates are not Cooper's and the trailer is over its stated weight. In exchange for not charging him, the police convince Cooper to leave four tons of his goods on the shoulder for them. Cooper quickly dumps some of the goods and tells the hitchhiker to close the door but the hitchhiker fails to secure the door and most of the tiles and live chickens pour out of the back and onto the highway.

Just as Cooper feels that he is getting into it the truck breaks down. Cooper leaves to find parts while the hitchhiker stays with the truck in the heat. Johnny Mesquitero (Bruce Bennett) appears and gives him advice on how to handle the truck. He promises to fix the truck if they do not push it too hard. He fixes the piston seals and tells the hitchhiker to take 10 pounds of pressure out of the tires so that they do not jackknife, then he leaves. When Cooper returns the hitchhiker tells him about Johnny's visit and Cooper tells the hitchhiker that Johnny Mesquitero died six years earlier in a jackknife accident.
They stop at a cafe where Cooper's friend the cook tells him that the police have been looking for him. That night Cooper steals the plates and papers from another truck to disguise his. They have to pass a weighbridge where Cooper convinces the police that a drunk hunter is shooting people on the hill. Two of the police leave to investigate and Cooper knocks the remaining one out with a glass bottle so that they can continue driving. Further ahead the road is closed for construction but Cooper insists that they can still use one of the lanes.

They stop at a racetrack where the hitchhiker asks Cooper for some money but Cooper refuses to share. Later as they are riding again the hitchhiker points a flare gun at Cooper and demands the goods in the truck. Cooper climbs into the back and when the hitchhiker follows Cooper knocks him out and locks him in. On his fourth night without sleep Cooper forces an oncoming car off the road when he dozes off and veers into the oncoming lane. Cooper arrives at a barn, where he unhitches and unlocks the trailer. The hitchhiker climbs out and angrily chases after him but Cooper drives off and leaves him. Further down the road Cooper attempts to sell the tractor to a man for $200. The man refuses and Cooper abandons the truck in the parking lot, continuing his journey as a hitchhiker.

Cast

Alan Arkin as Cooper
Paul Benedict as Hitchhiker
Hector Elizondo as Duke
Oliver Clark as Durazno
Bruce Bennett as Johnny Mesquitero
William Duell as Auto Parts Salesman
Charles Durning as Truck Driver in Cafe
Virgil Frye as Trouble Maker
Donna Anderson as Waitress
Richard Kiel as Big Dick
Avery Schreiber as Boss Fulano
John Millius and Phillip Kenneally as State Troopers
George Raft and Ida Lupino as Diner Customers

Release
The movie was never theatrically released.

See also
 List of American films of 1973

References

External links

1973 films
1973 comedy films
American comedy road movies
Paramount Pictures films
1970s comedy road movies
Trucker films
Films directed by Vernon Zimmerman
1970s English-language films
1970s American films